The Scenery of Farewell is the second EP by San Francisco indie band Two Gallants release on 4 June 2007 in the UK, and 19 June 2007 in the U.S. and Canada. According to the band, the five-track album is the result of the first of two 2007 recording sessions and reflects a more stripped down side of the band.

Track listing
 "Seems Like Home to Me" - 3:47
 "Lady" - 5:42
 "Up the Country" - 6:07
 "All Your Faithless Loyalties" - 5:12
 "Linger On" - 7:57

References

2007 EPs
Two Gallants (band) albums
Saddle Creek Records EPs